Nick Mamalis (born 1986) is an American mixed martial artist who most recently competed in the Bantamweight division. A professional competitor since 2006, he has competed for Bellator and Absolute Championship Berkut.

Background
Born and raised in Wyoming, Mamalis began wrestling at the age of six. At Green River High School, Mamalis continued with wrestling as well as playing football. He won three state titles for wrestling, in addition to a runner-up finish. In football, he won All-State honors and helped lead his team to a state title. In college, Mamalis wrestled for the Western Wyoming Community College Mustangs where he was the national runner-up at 125 lbs. during his sophomore season.

Mixed martial arts career

Bellator Fighting Championships
Mamalis made his Bellator Fighting Championships debut at Bellator 20, against Mark Oshiro. Oshiro entered the fight as a heavy favorite, having already been signed to compete in the Bellator season three bantamweight tournament, but Mamalis defeated Oshiro 1:29 into round 2 via rear naked choke.

With the victory, Mamalis earned a shot at a tournament qualifier bout at Bellator 23. His opponent, also fighting for a spot in the upcoming tournament, was Albert Rios. Once again, Mamalis entered the fight as the betting underdog. He defeated Rios via TKO due to strikes 4:40 into the first round, securing his place in the tournament. He would then lose consecutive fights at Bellator 27 and 29.

Absolute Championship Berkut
Mamalis faced Terrion Ware on January 13, 2017 at ACB 51. He lost the fight by unanimous decision.

Bare-knuckle boxing
Mamalis faced Johnny Bedford at a Bare Knuckle FC event held on June 2, 2018. He lost the fight via TKO in the second round.

Mixed martial arts record

|-
| Loss
| align=center| 28–14 (1)
| Ray Rodriguez
| Submission (d'arce choke)
| Rocks Xtreme MMA 26
| 
| align=center| 1
| align=center| 2:23
| Corpus Christi, Texas, United States
|
|-
| Loss
| align=center| 28–13 (1)
| Ricky Bandejas
| KO (punch)
| Cage Fury Fighting Championships 69
| 
| align=center| 4
| align=center| 4:07
| Atlantic City, New Jersey, United States
|
|-
| Loss
| align=center| 28–12 (1)
| Kevin Gray
| Technical Submission (guillotine choke)
| Victory Fighting Championship 57
| 
| align=center| 2
| align=center| 3:53
| Topeka, Kansas, United States
|
|-
| Win
| align=center| 28–11 (1)
| Nick Urso
| TKO (punches)
| Top Shelf Entertainment: Rocky Mountain Rubicon 4
| 
| align=center|2
| align=center|0:48
| Fountain, Colorado, United States
| 
|-
| Loss
|  align=center| 27–11 (1)
|  Terrion Ware
| Decision (unanimous)
| ACB 51: Silva vs. Torgeson
| 
| align=center| 3
| align=center| 5:00
| Irvine, California, United States
|
|-
| Win
| align=center| 27–10 (1)
| Adam Imhoff 
| TKO
| Rocky Mountain MMA 12: Fists of Fury 3
| 
| align=center|1
| align=center|1:00
| Rock Springs, Wyoming, United States
| 
|-
| Win
| align=center| 26–10 (1)
| Juan Santa Cruz
| TKO (injury)
| Rocky Mountain MMA 11: Fists of Fury 2
| 
| align=center|1
| align=center|2:05
| Rock Springs, Wyoming, United States
| 
|-
| Win
| align=center| 25–10 (1)
| Craig Ross
| Decision (unanimous)
| JHEFN: Jeremy Horn's Elite Fight Night 26
| 
| align=center|3
| align=center|5:00
| Salt Lake City, Utah, United States
|
|-
| Loss
| align=center| 24–10 (1)
| Czar Sklavos
| Submission (guillotine choke)
| Rocky Mountain MMA: Fist of Fury
| 
| align=center|1
| align=center|4:50
| Rock Springs, Wyoming, United States
|
|-
| Win
| align=center| 24–9 (1)
| Nick Honstein
| Decision (unanimous)
| SCL: Rivals
| 
| align=center|3
| align=center|5:00
| Denver, Colorado, United States
|
|-
| Loss
| align=center| 23–9 (1)
| Nick Denis
| KO (slam)
| Wreck MMA: Unfinished Business
| 
| align=center|2
| align=center|1:03
| Gatineau, Quebec, Canada
|
|-
| Win
| align=center| 23–8 (1)
| Randy Villarreal
| Submission (rear-naked Choke)
| BTT MMA 2: Genesis
| 
| align=center|1
| align=center|3:24
| Pueblo, Colorado, United States
|
|-
| Win
| align=center| 22–8 (1)
| Adrian Wooley
| Decision (split)
| Score Fighting Series 1
| 
| align=center|3
| align=center|5:00
| Mississauga, Ontario, Canada
|
|-
| Loss
| align=center| 21–8 (1)
| Ryan Roberts
| Decision (unanimous)
| The Cage Inc.: Battle at the Border 9
| 
| align=center|5
| align=center|5:00
| Hankinson, North Dakota, United States
| 
|-
| Win
| align=center| 21–7 (1)
| Josh Rave
| Submission (punches)
| VFC: Victory Fighting Championship 33
| 
| align=center|2
| align=center|1:30
| Iowa, United States
|
|-
| Loss
| align=center| 20–7 (1)
| Jameel Massouh
| Submission (guillotine choke)
| Bellator 29
| 
| align=center|1
| align=center|4:27
| Milwaukee, Wisconsin, United States
|Catchweight (140 lbs) bout.
|-
| Loss
| align=center| 20–6 (1)
| Zach Makovsky
| Decision (unanimous)
| Bellator 27
| 
| align=center|3
| align=center|5:00
| San Antonio, Texas, United States
|
|-
| Win
| align=center| 20–5 (1)
| Albert Rios
| TKO (strikes)
| Bellator 23
| 
| align=center|1
| align=center|4:40
| Louisville, Kentucky, United States
|
|-
| Win
| align=center| 19–5 (1)
| Mark Oshiro
| Submission (rear-naked choke)
| Bellator 20
| 
| align=center|2
| align=center|1:29
| San Antonio, Texas, United States
|
|-
| Loss
| align=center| 18–5 (1)
| Rafael de Freitas
| Submission (rear-naked Choke)
| Chavez Dojo - Revolutionary Rumble
| 
| align=center|1
| align=center|2:12
| Albuquerque, New Mexico, Mexico
|
|-
| Win
| align=center| 18–4 (1)
| Zach Wolff
| Decision (unanimous)
| VFC 30: Night of Champions
| 
| align=center|5
| align=center|5:00
| Council Bluffs, Iowa, United States
| 
|-
| Win
| align=center| 17–4 (1)
| Emmanuel Chapman
| TKO (punches)
| FI: Fight Industries
| 
| align=center|1
| align=center|1:53
| Rock Springs, Wyoming, United States
|
|-
| Win
| align=center| 16–4 (1)
| Ron Muir
| TKO (corner stoppage)
| FTW Featherweight Grand Prix Final Round
| 
| align=center|1
| align=center|5:00
| Denver, Colorado, United States
| 
|-
| Win
| align=center| 15–4 (1)
| Jesse Henley
| Submission (guillotine choke)
| FTW Featherweight Grand Prix Round Two
| 
| align=center|1
| align=center|1:00
| Denver, Colorado, United States
|
|-
| Loss
| align=center| 14–4 (1)
| Jesse Brock
| Submission (kneebar)
| Jeremy Horn's Elite Fight Night 9
| 
| align=center|2
| align=center|2:58
| Layton, Utah, United States
|
|-
| Win
| align=center| 14–3 (1)
| Jeff Willingham
| TKO (punches)
| WOFCF 3
| 
| align=center|1
| align=center|2:43
| Green River, Wyoming, United States
|
|-
| Win
| align=center| 13–3 (1)
| Olly Bradstreet
| Submission (triangle choke)
| WOFCF 2
| 
| align=center|2
| align=center|4:26
| Rock Springs, Wyoming, United States
|
|-
| Win
| align=center| 12–3 (1)
| Vellore Cabellero
| TKO (punches)
| FTW Featherweight Grand Prix Opening Round
| 
| align=center|2
| align=center|0:44
| Denver, Colorado, United States
|
|-
| Loss
| align=center| 11–3 (1)
| Steven Siler
| Submission (guillotine choke)
| Throwdown Showdown 3
| 
| align=center|1
| align=center|1:25
| Salt Lake City, Utah, United States
|
|-
| Win
| align=center| 11–2 (1)
| Woody Gonzales
| TKO (punches)
| Kraze in the Cage: Chapter 12
| 
| align=center|1
| align=center|N/A
| Rock Springs, Wyoming, United States
|
|-
| Win
| align=center| 10–2 (1)
| Eddie Pelczynski
| Submission (rear-naked Choke)
| WOFCF: Word of Fist Cage Fights 1
| 
| align=center|2
| align=center|N/A
| Rock Springs, Wyoming, United States
|
|-
| Win
| align=center| 9–2 (1)
| Ray Wolfley
| Submission (armbar)
| Kraze in the Cage: Chapter 11
| 
| align=center|1
| align=center|N/A
| Rock Springs, Wyoming, United States
|
|-
| Win
| align=center| 8–2 (1)
| Ty Hamblin
| Decision (unanimous)
| Kraze in the Cage: Chapter 10
| 
| align=center|3
| align=center|5:00
| Rock Springs, Wyoming, United States
|
|-
| Win
| align=center| 7–2 (1)
| Brandon Visher
| Decision (unanimous)
| Kraze in the Cage: Chapter 9
| 
| align=center|3
| align=center|5:00
| Rock Springs, Wyoming, United States
|
|-
| Win
| align=center| 6–2 (1)
| Mike Smith
| Decision (unanimous)
|Kraze in the Cage: Chapter 8
|
|align=center|3
|align=center|5:00
|Rock Springs, Wyoming, United States
|
|-
| NC
| align=center| 5–2 (1)
| Travis Marx
| No Contest
| Jeremy Horn's Elite Fight Night 1
| 
| align=center|2
| align=center|3:33
| Salt Lake City, Utah, United States
|
|-
| Win
| align=center| 5–2
| Ryan Schofield
| Submission (rear-naked choke)
| Kraze in the Cage: Chapter 7, Vol. 2
| 
| align=center|1
| align=center|N/A
| Rock Springs, Wyoming, United States
|
|-
| Win
| align=center| 4–2
| Brenton Swanson
| Submission (rear-naked choke)
| Kraze in the Cage: Chapter 7, Vol. 1
| 
| align=center|2
| align=center|N/A
| Rock Springs, Wyoming, United States
|
|-
| Loss
| align=center| 3–2
| Tyler Toner
| Submission (armbar)
| Battlequest 6: Shootout
| 
| align=center|1
| align=center|4:23
| Eagle, Colorado, United States
|
|-
| Win
| align=center| 3–1
| Dan Berry
| Submission (triangle choke)
| UCE Round 26: Episode 12
| 
| align=center|1
| align=center|1:29
| Ogden, Utah, United States
|
|-
| Win
| align=center| 2–1
| Erick Buck
| Submission (punches)
| Battlequest 5: Avalanche
| 
| align=center|2
| align=center|0:41
| Vail, Colorado, United States
|
|-
| Win
| align=center| 1–1
| Steve Hellman
| Submission (triangle choke)
| KITC: Kraze in the Cage
| 
| align=center|1
| align=center|N/A
| Wyoming, United States
|
|-
| Loss
| align=center| 0–1
| Raphael Assunção
| Submission (armbar)
| Ring of Fire 26
| 
| align=center|1
| align=center|3:35
| Castle Rock, Colorado, United States
|

Bare knuckle record

|- 
|Loss
|align=center|0-1
|Johnny Bedford
|TKO (punches)
|BKFC 1: The Beginning
|
|align=center|2
|align=center|1:41
|Cheyenne, Wyoming, United States
|
|-

References

External links

Living people
American male mixed martial artists
Mixed martial artists from Wyoming
Bantamweight mixed martial artists
Mixed martial artists utilizing boxing
Mixed martial artists utilizing collegiate wrestling
1986 births
Bare-knuckle boxers
American male boxers
American male sport wrestlers
People from Green River, Wyoming